Brachystola is a genus of grassland lubber grasshoppers in the family Romaleidae, found in the United States and Mexico. They are among the largest grasshoppers found in North America. The species Brachystola magna happens to have large and easily visible meiotic chromosomes, and was used in early genetic studies.

Species
These six species belong to the genus Brachystola:
 Brachystola behrensii Scudder, 1877
 Brachystola eiseni Bruner, 1906
 Brachystola magna (Girard, 1853) (plains lubber grasshopper)
 Brachystola mexicana Bruner, 1904
 Brachystola ponderosa Bruner, 1906
 Brachystola virescens (Charpentier, 1845)

References

Further reading

External links

 

Romaleidae